The Lamar Cardinals basketball team represents Lamar University in NCAA Division I men's basketball competition. The Cardinals currently play in the Southland Conference following a return from the Western Athletic Conference on July 11, 2022.  They were one of four programs, all from Texas, that left the Southland Conference on July 1, 2021, to join the Western Athletic Conference (WAC). Lamar left the Southland Conference for the second time, having initially joined at the league's formation in 1963, left in 1987, and returned in 1999. After one season in the WAC, Lamar returned to the Southland Conference. The Cardinals have played  home games in the Montagne Center since 1984. The Lamar University basketball team is one of the school's most storied athletic programs. The Cardinals have competed in NCAA Tournament play eleven times (five at the NCAA College Division (Division II) level) and six times at the NCAA Division I level with the most recent appearance in the 2012 tournament.  The 1979–80 team was one of the 1980 tournament's Sweet Sixteen teams. The Cardinals have also competed in four NIT tournaments.  Heading into the 2014–2015 season Lamar had a 284–143 record in the Montagne Center. The Cardinals overall record going into the 2014–2015 season was 922–818.

History

Early years
Basketball began in 1923 with the founding of South Park Junior College (renamed Lamar in 1932). In the early years the squad was hurt by a lack of common opponents and routinely had to play local high schools or city amateur teams. By 1931 the squad had been reduced to an intramural level. In 1946 the program was revived as Lamar entered the Southwestern Junior College Conference. The revived squad was an immediate success finishing 2nd with a 10–4 record by head coach Dave Engman. The next year under the veteran coaching of Elbert Pickell the 1947–1948 team pulled an enormous upset by capturing the state title with a 13–3 record. The following year the Cardinals continued to prosper under head coach Thurman "Slue" Hull who complied 49–30 record at Lamar before being hired away by the University of Texas. The following year the Cardinals began their transition to play against 4 year college competition with newly hired head coach Jack Martin.

Jack Martin years

Jack Martin was the first head basketball coach for Lamar as a four-year college.  He was also the longest serving head coach in Lamar's history. He came to Lamar after coaching three seasons at his alma mater, Hardin-Simmons University. Martin began coaching the Cardinals as they entered the college division Lone Star Conference in 1951. Martin coached Billy Tubbs from 1955 to 1957, Tubbs would later become the first player or student to return and coach Lamar Basketball. In 1964 Lamar began its transition into division I and the Southland Conference.  Coach Martin's Cardinals won the Lone Star Conference title three seasons, the Southland Conference title two seasons, and competed in five NCAA College Division (now NCAA Division II) tournaments.  After the 1975–76 season, Coach Martin was replaced by one of his former players and former assistant coach, Billy Tubbs.  The Cardinals compiled a 334–283 record under Martin.

Martin coached one AP NCAA College Division All-American, Don Bryson (1965), and one AP NCAA Division I All-American, Earl Dow (1969). One of Coach Martin's players, Luke Adams, was drafted by the NBA.

1968–69 Season

The highlight of Jack Martin's career would be his 1968–1969 squad that earned a #1 national ranking in the Associated Press college division poll. Martin's squad that year won its first 15 games of the season against very strong competition.  The Cardinals won their first game against Pepperdine 65–64 then traveled to Memphis and beat a strong Memphis State team, 82–69. A week later, they quieted a stunned crowd in College Station's G. Rollie White Coliseum by strumming Southwest Conference champion Texas A&M, 98–87.  With the Cardinals sitting at 6–0 and sixth-ranked University of Tulsa coming to town, most observers figured the good times were at an end. Instead, they kept rolling as Martin's flashy Cards decked Tulsa, 103–77.

"Since we had gone 8–17 the previous season, what that team did to start that year has to be one of the greatest surprises ever in Lamar basketball, at least up until that point," said Joe Lee Smith, then LU's director of sports information. "They beat a good Pepperdine team and an outstanding Memphis State team to get started, then they beat Texas A&M on the road, which was totally unexpected.

"Tulsa was ranked No. 6, but we kicked the dog out of them. That triggered a lot of national attention. It was the first year for us to be fully Division I, and after that win we started getting a few votes in the major college polls."

After the Cardinals held off Arkansas State 84–81 in Jonesboro to tie the school record of 12-straight wins, they rose to No. 18 in the United Press International major college poll. They were the only team ranked in both polls.

A few nights later, the prominent Houston Cougars, who had been to the Final Four the previous season, came to McDonald Gym. Coach Guy Lewis' Cougars had never lost to Lamar, up until this point. With 8:15 left in the game, the Cardinals trailed 56–44, but they rallied to go ahead 61–59 in the final minute. The Cougars scored in the final seconds, however, and the teams went into overtime tied at 61.

The overflow throng in McDonald Gym and those viewing the game by closed-circuit television in a nearby dining hall erupted into bedlam when forward Jim Nicholson stole the ball and went in for a layup seconds after the overtime tipoff. Then, spindly guard Earl Dow popped in a corner jumper to give the Cards a four-point lead, and they controlled the rest of overtime, winning 71–65.

On a cold Feb. 1 night in Abilene, the record streak reached 15 games with an 85–72 victory over Abilene Christian. Two nights later on "The Stage" in Arlington, it ended with a 76–71 loss to Texas–Arlington.

Billy Tubbs years

Coach Tubbs (1976–1980) was the first former player and alumnus to coach the Lamar men's basketball team. Tubbs led the Cardinals to their first NCAA Division I basketball tournament in 1979.  The tenth seeded Cardinals upset the number seven seed Detroit before falling to tournament champion Michigan State in the second round.  The following year, the Cardinals under Coach Tubbs, had a Cinderella story in the 1980 NCAA basketball tournament as a ten seed advancing to the Sweet 16.  The Cardinals defeated number seven seed Weber State and number two seed Oregon State before falling to six seed Clemson.

Coach Tubbs left the Cardinals after the 1979–1980 season to take the head basketball coach job at Oklahoma.  During Tubbs's reign at Lamar he recruited one player, Mike Olliver who would become an all-American for Lamar.  One of Coach Tubbs' recruits, Clarence Kea, was drafted by the NBA while Tubbs was still at Lamar.  Three other Tubbs recruited players, Mike Olliver, B. B. Davis, and Alvin Brooks, were drafted the year following Tubbs' departure.

The 1979 Cardinal Basketball team set records when it beat Portland State University 141–84; at the time, that game set an NCAA record for points in a single game. During the game, Mike Olliver set the single game scoring record at Lamar with 50 points; that record stood until January 4, 2011.

Coach Tubbs' Cardinals began the 80 game seventh longest NCAA home court winning streak (discussed below) winning the first 31 games.

Pat Foster years

Pat Foster (1980–1986) was hired to replace Billy Tubbs.  Foster came to Lamar as an assistant coach under Eddie Sutton at Arkansas.  He continued Lamar's men's basketball success by leading the Cardinals to 3 Southland Conference titles and post season play each of the six years he was head coach at Lamar.  Post-season included two (2) NCAA Tournament appearances advancing to the second round in both.  The Cardinals also participated in the NIT four (4) times advancing to the second round once.  The Cardinals won twenty (20) or more games five of Coach Foster's six seasons at Lamar.  He coached one All-American, two Southland Conference Players of the Year, two Southland Conference Newcomers of the Year, seven Southland Conference First Team selections and fifteen All-Southland Conference team selections.  Not including three players recruited by Billy Tubbs' staff, five of Coach Foster's recruits were drafted by the NBA.  Those players were Terry Long, Lamont Robinson, Tom Sewell, Jerry Everett, and Greg Anderson."

After turning down the Houston Cougars head coaching position once, Foster resigned as Lamar's head coach in April, 1986 to take the head coaching position at Houston following Guy Lewis's retirement.  Pat Foster was named to the Lamar Hall of Honor in 2014 in recognition of his contributions to the program as Lamar coach and athletic director.  His record at Lamar of 134 wins ranks as second in the history of the program.

Coach Foster's Cardinals continued the 80 game seventh longest NCAA home court winning streak (discussed below) with 49 consecutive home court wins.

Tom Abatemarco years

Tom Abatemarco  (1986–1988) was hired in 1986.  He was previously an assistant coach for the North Carolina State Wolfpack under Jimmy Valvano serving there from 1982 to 1986.  Coach Abatemarco's first season record as head coach at Lamar was a disappointing 14–15 (4–6 SLC).  The next season saw a new conference and a better record.  The Cardinals posted a 20–11 overall and a 5–5 conference record  in the newly created American South Conference.  Abatemarco left Lamar after his second year accepting a head coaching position at Drake University.

James Gulley played basketball for Lamar University for four seasons, including during the tenure of Abatemarco, graduating in 1988. In 1986–87 Gulley led the Southland Conference with 288 rebounds and 9.9 rebounds per game. He played in 113 career games for the Cardinals, and scored 1,832 points (16.2 ppg), had 967 rebounds (8.6 rpg), and 719 field goals, each of which is third all-time in school history. He was a four-time all-conference selection, and named 1988 All-American South Conference.

Tony Branch years

Tony Branch (1988–1990), an assistant coach under Tom Abatemarco was named head coach in 1988. After two disappointing seasons, he was relieved of his duties at the end of the 1989–1990 season. Although the overall records were disappointing, Branch's teams had out of conference wins over Tulsa, Texas A&M, and Rice.

Mike Newell years

Mike Newell (1990–1993) was hired in 1990.  He came to Lamar after serving as head coach at University of Arkansas at Little Rock for six seasons taking the UALR Trojans to post-season play five consecutive seasons.  The Cardinals moved from the American South Conference to the Sun Belt Conference in Coach Newell's second season with the Cardinals.  His overall record at Lamar was 42–44 (20–26 conference).

Grey Giovanine years

Grey Giovanine (1993–1999), an assistant coach at Wichita State, was hired to replace Mike Newell.  The Cardinals competed as  members of the Sun Belt Conference his first five seasons at Lamar before returning to the Southland Conference in his final season with the Cardinals.  His overall record with the Cardinals was 80–85 (47–61 Conference).  Out of conference highlights of his years at Lamar were wins over Baylor and LSU.

Mike Deane years

Mike Deane (1999–2003) was hired in 1999. In his first year, he returned the Cardinals to the NCAA tournament for the first time since the Pat Foster era. The Cardinals played Duke in the first round of the 2000 NCAA tournament.

Billy Tubbs return

Billy Tubbs (2003–2006) returned to Lamar University in 2002 as Athletics Director.  In addition to Athletics Director, Tubbs returned as the Cardinals basketball team head coach in 2003 following Mike Deane's reassignment. Tubbs' return was highly anticipated and increased attendance. He turned the program around from 10th place in 2003 to tied for 4th in 2006. In 2006 Coach Tubbs stepped down as Head Basketball Coach to concentrate on the athletic director position. He was succeeded by assistant and Lamar Alumnus Steve Roccaforte.

Steve Roccaforte years

During the Roccaforte era (2006–2011), Lamar Basketball Lamar had erratic success. The Cardinals had wins over major programs like the Texas Tech Red Raiders in 2008. Coach Roc took the Cardinals to the East Division Championship and a 19 win season in 2007–2008. Following the SLC championship the Cardinals failed to reach the conference tournament for the next three seasons.

Coach Roc's tenure at Lamar was marked by some successes and very highly ranked recruiting classes. As proof of coach Roccaforte's eye for talent, Mike James a coach Roccaforte recruit, scored 52 points in 28 minutes in a 114–62 win over Louisiana College. James's performance was the top single-game scoring performance of the 2011 NCAA basketball season.

Pat Knight years

On April 5, 2011, Lamar University announced the hiring of Pat Knight, as its new head men's basketball coach. In Knight's first season with the Cardinals he took them to their first 20 win season since Tom Abatemarco's 1988 squad finished 20–11. The 2011–2012 squad finished with a 20–11 regular season record and an 11–5 Southland Conference record, finishing in 3rd place. In the last game of the regular season, Lamar won at home over arch-rival McNeese State. The head-to-head matchup clinched Lamar the Southland Conference East Division Championship. Lamar would go on to win the Southland Conference Championship and earn their first NCAA appearance since 2000.  In the midst of the two worst seasons in Lamar's history and a 3–22 season during his third year at the helm, Pat Knight was relieved of his duties on February 16, 2014.

Tic Price years

On February 16, 2014, Lamar University announced that Tic Price would be interim head men's basketball coach. The Cardinals closed out the 2013–2014 with 1 win and 4 losses under Coach Price.  On March 18, 2014, Tic Price was named the Cardinals eleventh head basketball coach.

In Tic Price's first full season as head coach of the Cardinals men's basketball team, the Cardinals had the 11th best turnaround in NCAA Division I men's basketball .  The Cardinals improved from a record of 4–26 for the previous season to 15–15 record at the conclusion of the 2014–15 season.

(Won/loss record reflects results of games through the 2020–21 season.)

Coaches

The Cardinals have had 12 coaches since becoming a senior college (4-year institution) in 1951. Jack Martin was the first coach.  Alvin Brooks is the current coach.  Three Cardinal coaches have been named Southland Conference Coach of the Year:Jack Martin in  1969 and 1970, Billy Tubbs in 1978 and 1980, and Pat Foster in 1984.  Steve Roccaforte shared CollegeInsider.com Southland Conference Coach of the Year honors in 2008.  Five Cardinal coaches have taken their teams to NCAA tournaments: Jack Martin in 1960, 1962, 1963, 1964 (NCAA Division II); Billy Tubbs in 1979 and 1980; Pat Foster in 1981 and 1983; Mike Deane in 2000; and Pat Knight in 2012.

Postseason

NCAA Division I Tournament results
The Cardinals have appeared in six NCAA Division I Tournaments, all as Lamar University. Their combined record is 5–6.

Source:

NCAA Division II Tournament results
The Cardinals have appeared in five NCAA Division II Tournaments as Lamar State College of Technology. Their combined record is 5–5.

Source:

NIT results
The Cardinals have appeared in four National Invitation Tournaments (NIT). Their combined record is 2–4.

Source:

CIT results
The Cardinals have appeared in the CollegeInsider.com Postseason Tournament (CIT) two times. Their combined record is 0–2.

Miscellaneous history

80-game home win streak
From 1978 to 1984 Lamar had one of the longest home court win streaks in NCAA history. The Cardinals compiled 80 wins between February 18, 1978, and March 10, 1984. The streak began February 18, 1978 against Arkansas State as the Cardinals cruised to a 59–54 victory. On March 10, 1984, as Lamar was hosting the Southland Conference tournament, Louisiana Tech came to town with future Hall of Famer Karl Malone. The Bulldogs would win 68–65 and advance to the NCAA tournament. McDonald Gym (37 games) and the Beaumont Civic Center (43 games) were Lamar's home-court during the win streak. Currently the win streak is 7th all time in NCAA division I history.

Attendance

Source:

Top 10 attendance marks
Below is a list of the Cardinals 10 best-attended games men's* home games (all at the Montagne Center).

As of the 2018–19 season.
*Note: Record home attendance for a Lady Cardinals game at the Montagne Center 9,143 was on March 17, 1991, vs the LSU Lady Tigers.

Yearly attendance
Below is a list of the attendance by year since the Cardinals moved into the Montagne Center.

* Fall 2020 attendance limited to 25% capacity due to COVID19 precautions.
As of the 2021–22 season.

Awards and honors

Retired jerseys
Below is a list of retired Cardinals jerseys.
Sources:

National and regional awards and honors

All-Americans 

Don Bryson – AP All-American (College Division), 3rd Team, 1965
Earl Dow – AP All-American (Division I), 2nd Team, 1969
Mike Olliver – Citizens Savings Foundation All-American (Division I), 1st Team, 1981
Matt Sundbald – Verizon/CoSIDA Academic All-American, 3rd Team, 1998, 1st Team, 1999

Academic Athlete of the Year
Matt Sundblad, Verizon/CoSIDA Men's Basketball Academic Athlete of the Year, 1999

All-Star games
Earl Dow, East-West All-Star Game, 1969
Tom Sewell, NABC All-Star Game, 1984

USBWA All-District VI Team
B B Davis, 1980, 81
Mike Olliver, 1981 (Co-Player of the Year)
Tom Sewell, 1984
Alan Daniels, 2006
Kenny Dawkins, 2nd Team, 2009
Jay Brown, 2nd Team, 2009

Southland Conference honors
Sources:

Player of the Year
Kenny Haynes, 1970
Luke Adams, 1971
Mike Olliver, 1981
Tom Sewell, 1984

Newcomer of the Year
B. B. Davis, 1978
Jerry Everett, 1984
James Gulley, 1985
Lamar Sanders, 2007
Kenny Dawkins, 2008
Tyran de Lattibeaudiere, 2015

Coach of the Year
Jack Martin, 1969, 70
Billy Tubbs, 1978, 80
Pat Foster, 1984

First Team All-Conference
Luke Adams, 1970, 71
Ron Austin, 2003
Don Bryson, 1965
Alan Daniels, 2005, 06
Kenny Dawkins, 2008
B. B. Davis, 1978, 79, 81
Earl Dow, 1968, 69
Jerry Everett, 1985
Nick Garth, 2019
James Gulley, 1987
Don Heller, 1964
Mike James, 2012
Henry Jones, 1976
Clarence Kea, 1980
Jim Nicholson, 1968
Alfred Nicholson, 1974
Mike Olliver, 1979, 80, 81
Lamont Robinson, 1984
Lamar Sanders, 2008
Tom Sewell, 1983, 84
Anthony Todd, 1986
Jerry Wade, 1965
Colton Weisbrod, 2017, 18

Most Valuable Player
Kenny Haynes, 1970
Luke Adams, 1971
Mike Olliver, 1981
Tom Sewell, 1984

Tournament Most Valuable Player
Mike Olliver, 1981
Lamont Robinson, 1983
Jerry Everett, 1985
Landon Rowe, 2000
Mike James, 2012

All-decade teams

1960s
Don Bryson, Earl Dow
Co-Coach of the Decade – Jack Martin

1970s
Luke Adams, Clarence Kea
Coach of the Decade – Billy Tubbs

1980s
B. B. Davis, Anthony Todd, Jerry Everett, James Gulley, Mike Olliver, Kenneth Perkins, Lamont Robinson, Tom Sewell
Coach of the Decade – Pat Foster

2000s
Alan Daniels, Larry Sanders

American South Conference honors

All Conference teams
James Gulley & Adrian Caldwell, 1989

Sun Belt Conference honors

All Conference teams
Atiim Browne, 1994
Ron Coleman, 1995, 97
Lucas Wagler, 1996

Freshman of the Year
Keith Veney, 1993

Cardinals in the NBA
Lamar University has had four players who played in the NBA and ten players who were picked in the NBA draft. The players are listed below.

Played in the NBA
 Adrian Caldwell 1989–1997 (Undrafted) Played in 197 NBA games for the Houston Rockets, Indiana Pacers, Philadelphia 76ers, New Jersey Nets, and the Dallas Mavericks
 Clarence Kea 1980–1982 (Drafted – See below) Played for the Dallas Mavericks
 Tom Sewell 1984 (Drafted – See below) Played for the Washington Bullets
 Mike James 2017–2018 (Undrafted) Played for the Phoenix Suns and New Orleans Pelicans.

Drafted players
 Luke Adams, 1971 – Los Angeles Lakers Round 8, Pick 13
 Greg Anderson, 1986 – Dallas Mavericks Round 6, Pick 15
 Alvin Brooks, 1989 – San Antonio Spurs Round 10, Pick 17
 B. B. Davis, 1981 – Kansas City Kings Round 4, Pick 13
 Jerry Everett, 1985 – Phoenix Suns Round 3, Pick 9
 Clarence Kea, Dallas Mavericks Round 8, 9th Pick
 Terry Long, 1982 – Portland Trail Blazers Round 7, Pick 11
 Mike Olliver, 1981 – Chicago Bulls Round 2, Pick 9 draft rights traded to the Indiana Pacers
 Lamont Robinson, 1984 – Chicago Bulls Round 5, Pick 2
 Tom Sewell, 1984 – Philadelphia 76ers Round 1, 22nd Pick

References

External links
 Official Website